Melanolycaena is a genus of butterflies in the family Lycaenidae.

References

Lycaeninae
Lycaenidae genera